is a small Aten asteroid that made one of the closest recorded asteroid close approaches of Earth on 27 January 2012.

During its 2012 close approach to Earth,  had a brightest apparent magnitude of about 13.9, making it about as bright as the dwarf planet Pluto. By 25 February 2012, it had dimmed to magnitude 30.

See also
List of asteroid close approaches to Earth in 2012

References

External links 
 "Zippy little asteroid 2012 BX34 makes a quick visit". Astro Bob. 27 January 2012. Retrieved 11 July 2013.
 2012 BX34 – Close Approach. (Ernesto Guido, Giovanni Sostero & Nick Howes). 27 January 2012. Retrieved 11 July 2013.
 "Asteroid makes near-miss fly-by". BBC. 27 January 2012. Retrieved 11 July 2013.
"Bus-Size Asteroid Buzzes Earth in Close Flyby". Space.com. 27 January 2012. Retrieved 11 July 2013.
 
 
 

Minor planet object articles (unnumbered)
20120127
20120125